Itik is a Papuan language of Indonesia. It was not found in a 2005 language survey; it is not clear if this means it is no longer spoken or if the speakers have moved.

References

External links
Rosetta Project: Itik Swadesh list

Languages of western New Guinea
Orya–Tor languages